Scott Green may refer to:
Scott Green (American football official), DC criminal justice lobbyist and NFL referee
Scott Green (footballer), former English football (soccer) player
Scott E. Green, American writer, legislator and union activist
"Scott Green", a song by Dune Rats from The Kids Will Know It's Bullshit
C. Scott Green, American university president